Goj or GOJ may refer to:

 Goj, Silesian Voivodeship, Poland
 Ervin Goj (1905–1989), Czech poet
 Ghosts of Jupiter, an American rock band
 Government of Jamaica
 Government of Japan
 Government of Jersey
 Gowlan tongue
 Strigino International Airport, serving Nizhny Novgorod, Russia

See also
 Goi (disambiguation)
 Goy (disambiguation)